In popular music, a re-edit is an altered version of a recorded song created by repeating, reordering, or removing sections of the original recording - for example, making a chorus repeat several times in a row, or extending the length of a break section. Like remixes, re-edits are especially common in dance music.

References
 Broughton, Frank, and Bill Brewster. How to DJ Right: the art and science of playing records (New York: Grove Press, 2003), 234–237, 282.

See also
 Audio editing

Musical techniques
Music production